James or Jim Malone may refer to:

James F. Malone (1904–1976), Allegheny County District Attorney in the 1950s for Pittsburgh
James E. Malone Jr. (born 1957), member of the Maryland House of Delegates
James L. Malone (American football) (1908–1979), first head football coach for the University of Louisiana at Monroe Warhawks
James L. Malone (diplomat) (born 1931), Asst. Secretary of State in the Reagan Administration
James Malone (Australian politician) (1878–1952), New South Wales politician
James Malone (musician), member of the band Arsis
James William Malone (1920–2000), Roman Catholic bishop of Youngstown
Jim Malone (footballer) (1925–2021), North Melbourne VFL footballer
Jim Malone (ice hockey) (born 1962), retired Canadian ice hockey player
Jim Malone, a character in the 1987 film The Untouchables, played by Sean Connery
James Joseph Malone (1883–?), Australian engineer